The 2022 Penn State Nittany Lions men's volleyball team represents Pennsylvania State University in the 2022 NCAA Division I & II men's volleyball season. The Nittany Lions, led by 28th year head coach Mark Pavlik, play their home games at Rec Hall. The Nittany Lions are members of the Eastern Intercollegiate Volleyball Association and were picked to win the EIVA in the preseason poll.

Roster

Schedule

 *-Indicates conference match.
 Times listed are Eastern Time Zone.

Broadcasters
BYU: No commentary
BYU: Jake Starr & Jordan Mansberger 
Grand Canyon: Connor Griffin & Alex Rocco
Grand Canyon: Zech Lambert & Alex Rocco
USC: Anne Marie Anderson
UCLA: Denny Cline
UC Santa Barbara: Max Kelton & Katie Spieler
Long Beach State: Matt Brown & Matt Prosser
Princeton: Logan Bourandus & Matt Scalzo
George Mason: Logan Bourandus & Emma Holt
Harvard: Dana Grey & Ben Altsher
Sacred Heart: Brendan Picozzi
St. Francis: Preston Shoemaker & Jon Draeger
St. Francis Brooklyn: Marc Ernay
NJIT: Ira Thor & Mike Ventola
Charleston (WV): No commentary
Ohio State: Tyler Danburg & Joey Veer
Ohio State: Mac Young & Austin Groft
Princeton: Adam Dobrowolski & Melina Mahood
George Mason: 
Harvard: Austin Groft & Thomas English
Sacred Heart: Dale Ostrander & Aidan Torok
St. Francis: Matt Manz & Sophie Rice
St. Francis Brooklyn: Thomas English & Trevor Grady
NJIT: Neil Conley & Evan Popalis
Charleston (WV): No commentary

Rankings 

^The Media did not release a Pre-season poll.

Honors
To be filled in upon completion of the season.

References

2022 in sports in Pennsylvania
2022 NCAA Division I & II men's volleyball season
2022 team
Penn State